Beipan River is a river in Guizhou and Yunnan provinces, China, and part of the great Pearl River basin.

Other names
The upper reaches in Yunnan and Guizhou were once known as the Zangke River.

Course

The Beipan River passes through the modern Chinese provinces of Yunnan and Guizhou. When reaching the border of  Guangxi, the Beipan River (literally, the Northern Pan River) merges with the Nanpan River (the Southern Pan River), forming the Hongshui River, which continues to the southeast.

History
The river was significant in history as a communications pathway between the Yelang and Nanyue kingdoms.

Bridges
The river is crossed by the Duge Bridge, the world's highest, the Qinglong Railway Bridge, the Guanxing Highway via the Beipan River Guanxing Highway Bridge, the Liupanshui-Baiguo Railway via the Beipan River Shuibai Railway Bridge, and the G60 Hukun Expressway via the Beipan River Hukun Expressway Bridge.  All of these bridges are among the highest in the world.

There are other bridges under construction over the river that are also extremely high:
Beipan River Shuipan Expressway Bridge
Beipan River Wang'an Highway Bridge

Dams
There are a number of dams along the river including the Guangzhao Dam.

See also
List of rivers in China

References

Rivers of Guizhou
Tributaries of the Pearl River (China)